Ahmed Abu Bakar Said Al-Kaf (born 1983) is an Omani professional football referee. He has been a full international for FIFA since 2010.

References

External links 
 
 

1983 births
Living people
Omani football referees
AFC Asian Cup referees